New Carrollton is an unincorporated community in Shelby Township, Ripley County, in the U.S. state of Indiana.

History
A post office was established at New Carrollton in 1837, and remained in operation until it was discontinued in 1839.

Geography

References

Unincorporated communities in Ripley County, Indiana
Unincorporated communities in Indiana